The Americas Conference on Information Systems (AMCIS) is an annual conference for information systems and information technology academics and professionals sponsored by the Association for Information Systems. AMCIS is widely considered to be one of the most prestigious conferences for IS/IT in the Western Hemisphere, and provides a platform for panel discussions and the presentation of peer-reviewed information systems research papers. The conference attracts over 600 submissions each year, and those that are selected for presentation appear in the AMCIS Proceedings, which are distributed to hundreds of libraries throughout the world.

The first AMCIS conference took place in 1995 in Pittsburgh and is notable for being the first IS/IT conference to utilize electronic paper submissions. Since that time, AMCIS has been held every August in different cities and attracts between 800 and 1,200 registered delegates every year. In 2006, AMCIS was held in Acapulco, Mexico, thereby marking a major milestone for the conference insofar as it was the first time AMCIS has been held outside of the United States. In 2008, AMCIS was held in Toronto, Canada, and, in 2012, in Lima, Peru. A Portuguese-language track was added in 2008. This continued in 2009 at the San Francisco conference and was a large component of the 2010 Lima conference.

AMCIS venues

External links

AmCIS proceedings

Information systems conferences
Academic conferences
Association for Information Systems conferences